

Dinosaurs

Newly named dinosaurs
Data courtesy of George Olshevsky's dinosaur genera list.

Plesiosaurs

New taxa

Synapsids

Non-mammalian

Newly named mammals

References

1920s in paleontology
Paleontology
Paleontology 4